
Year 695 (DCXCV) was a common year starting on Friday (link will display the full calendar) of the Julian calendar. The denomination 695 for this year has been used since the early medieval period, when the Anno Domini calendar era became the prevalent method in Europe for naming years.

Events 
 By place 
 Byzantine Empire 
 The population of Byzantium revolts under Leontios, the strategos (military governor) of the Anatolic Theme, and proclaims him emperor. Justinian II is deposed and his nose is cut off (leading to his subsequent nickname of "the Slit-nosed"). He is exiled to Cherson (Crimea), and begins to plot an attempt to retake the throne. 

 Britain 
 September 6 – King Wihtred of Kent, who maintains Kentish independence against the growing expansion of Mercia, issues one of the earliest known law codes of Britain.
 King Aldfrith of Northumbria marries Princess Cuthburh, sister of King Ine of Wessex (approximate date).

 Central America 
June 15 – Uaxaclajuun Ub'aah K'awiil ("Eighteen Rabbit") becomes the new ruler of the Mayan city state of Copán in Honduras  upon the death of Chan Imix K'awiil, and rules until his death in 736.
 The Mayan city state of Tikal defeats Calakmul in what is now Guatemala, ending a centuries-long rivalry, but ushering in another century of warfare that ultimately leads to both cities' abandonment in the 9th century.

 Europe 
 Childebert III succeeds Clovis IV as sole king of the Franks. He is the son of Theuderic III and becomes a puppet—a roi fainéant—of Pepin of Herstal, mayor of the palace of Austrasia.
 Pepin institutes his son Drogo as mayor of the palace of Burgundy. His younger son Grimoald II becomes mayor of the palace of Neustria. 
 The Saxons defeat the Bructeri between the Lippe and the Ruhr, and occupy Westphalia in Germany (approximate date).

 By topic 
 Religion 
 November 21 – Willibrord, Northumbrian missionary, becomes the first bishop of Utrecht (Netherlands). He returns to Frisia to preach, and builds numerous churches (approximate date).
 Willibrord establishes a Benedictine training centre for priests and young noblemen. This seminary later becomes Utrecht University.
 Suitbert, Anglo-Saxon missionary, founds a monastery at Kaiserswerth (near Düsseldorf) in Germany (approximate date).

Births 
 Fujiwara no Maro, Japanese statesman (d. 737)
 Herlindis of Maaseik, Frankish abbess (approximate date)
 Kibi no Makibi, Japanese scholar (d. 775)
 Muhammad ibn al-Qasim, Umayyad general (d. 715)
 Ōtomo no Koshibi, Japanese general (d. 777)
 Emperor Shang of Tang, Chinese ruler (or 698)
 Theophilus of Edessa, Greek astrologer (d. 785)
 Zayd ibn Ali, Arab imam and grandson of Husayn ibn Ali (d. 740)

Deaths 
 Ado, duke of Friuli (Northern Italy)
 Ansbert of Rouen, Frankish bishop
 Chan Imix K'awiil, Mayan ruler (ajaw)
 Sæbbi, king of Kent (approximate date)
 Stephen the Persian, chief eunuch and sakellarios of the Byzantine Empire under Justinian II

References

Sources